Maria Teresa Gómez Arteaga, also known as Teresita Gomez, is a Colombian pianist and music educator.

Education 
Teresita Gomez was born in Medellin, Colombia and began her piano training at the age of 4 with the teachers Marta Agudelo de Maya and Anna María Penella in the Institute of Fine Arts of Medellín, where she gave her first solo concert when she was only 10 years old.

Teresita studied piano at the National University of Colombia with the Russian pianist Tatiana Goncharova and the German pianist Hilde Adler between 1959 and 1962. Later on she was a student of the Colombian-Dutch pianist Harold Martina at the University of Antioquia between 1964 and 1966, where she graduated summa cum laude as Concertmaster and Piano Teacher.

Among her mentors are Barbara Hesse (Varsovia, 1985), Jakob Lateiner (Weimar 1986) and Klaus Bässler (Berlín, 1986–87).

Awards 

In 2005, the government of Colombia grants her the Cross of Orden de Boyacá in the degree of Comendador for her artistic career, contribution to the musical culture and honorable representation of Colombia abroad.

In 2017, the Antioquia Governor awarded Juan del Corral in the gold category categoría, for her musical contributions over 60 years as a professional pianist.

Festivals and venues  

 Quinteto de Bogotá
 Frank Preuss Trio
 Conjunto Colombiano de Música Contemporánea
 Medellin Opera
 Colombian Opera
 Bogota and Medellin Bach Festivals
 Festival de Música Religiosa de Popayán
 Jeleniej Górze Symphonic Orchestra (Poland)
 Professor at Instituto de Bellas Artes de Medellín, Universidad de Antioquia, Universidad de Caldas, Universidad del Cauca and Los Andes University
 Cultural Attaché at the Colombian Embassy in (Germany) (1983–87)

Discography 
 Para Recordar Compositores colombianos – CD – Universidad de Antioquia
 Teresa Gómez a Colombia – CD – Sonotec
 Intimo – CD – Alcaldía de Medellín/Universidad de Antioquia
 Antología I – CD – ColMusica 2007
 Teresita Gómez 60 años de vida artística – CD

References 

1943 births
Living people
Colombian pianists
20th-century pianists
21st-century pianists
Women classical pianists
University of Antioquia alumni
Colombian people of African descent
Afro-Colombian women